Alfred Croisetière (July 21, 1922 – October 17, 2014) was a Canadian politician and a two-term Member of the Legislative Assembly of Quebec.

Background

He was born on July 21, 1922, in Winooski, Vermont.

Member of the legislature

Croisetière ran as a Union Nationale candidate in the 1962 election in the provincial district of Iberville.  He lost against Liberal incumbent Laurent Hamel.

He was elected in the 1966 election and was re-elected in the 1970 election.  He served as his party's Deputy House Whip from 1966 until his defeat against Liberal candidate Jacques-Raymond Tremblay in the 1973 election.

City Councillor

Croisetière served as a city councillor in Iberville, Montérégie from 1975 to 1983.

References

1922 births
2014 deaths
Union Nationale (Quebec) MNAs
American emigrants to Canada